Melanau is an Austronesian language spoken in the coastal area of the Rajang delta on northwest Borneo, Sarawak, Malaysia and Brunei.  There are several dialects—Mukah-Oya, Balingian, Bruit, Dalat, Lawas, Igan, Sarikei, Segahan, Prehan, Segalang, and Siteng.

Phonology

Consonants 
Melanau has the following consonants.

Vowels 
Melanau has the following vowels.

Sounds  can have allophones of [ ~  ].

Orthography

Vowels and diphthongs 
 a – 
 aa – 
 e – 
 i – 
 o – 
 u – 
 ai – 
 au – 
 ei – 
 ou – 
 ui –

Consonants 
 b – 
 c – 
 d – 
 g – 
 h – 
 j – 
 k – 
 l – 
 m – 
 n – 
 ng – 
 ny – 
 p – 
 r – 
 s – 
 t – 
 w – 
 y –

Notes

References 
I.F.C.S. Clayre.  1970.  "The Spelling of Melanau (nee Milano)," The Sarawak Museum Journal 18:330-352.
Clayre, Iain F. C. S. 1972. A grammatical description of Melanau. University of Edinburgh.
Rensch, Calvin R. 2012. Melanau and the Languages of Central Sarawak. SIL Electronic Survey Report. SIL International.

External links 
 Kaipuleohone holds two open access collections that include Balingian language materials (RB1-002 and RB2-003-E) as well as notebook pages of stories
 

Languages of Brunei
Languages of Malaysia
Melanau–Kajang languages